The solar storm of 2012 was a solar storm involving an unusually large and strong coronal mass ejection that occurred on July 23, 2012. It missed Earth with a margin of approximately nine days, as the equator of the Sun rotates around its own axis with a period of about 25 days.

The region that produced the outburst was thus not pointed directly towards Earth at that time. The strength of the eruption has been predicted to be comparable to the 1859 Carrington Event that caused damage to electrical equipment worldwide, which at that time consisted mostly of telegraph systems.

Overview

At 02:08 UT on 23 July 2012, a large coronal mass ejection (CME) was launched from the Sun. The eruption emanated from solar active region 11520 and coincided with what was at most an X2.5-class solar flare. The CME expelled a pair of adjacent magnetic clouds that drove a fast-moving shock wave outward from the Sun. The eruption tore through Earth's orbit, hitting the STEREO-A spacecraft. The spacecraft is a solar observatory equipped to measure such activity, and  because it was far away from the Earth and thus not exposed to the strong electrical currents that can be induced when a CME hits the Earth's magnetosphere, it survived the encounter and provided researchers with valuable data. Spacecraft observations recorded the shockwave at 20:55 UTC on 23 July while the magnetic clouds arrived two hours later. The leading shock wave associated with the CME was travelling radially at a speed of around  relative to STEREO-A by the time it reached the spacecraft.

Based on the collected data, the eruption consisted of two separate ejections which were able to reach exceptionally high strength as the interplanetary medium around the Sun had been cleared by a smaller CME four days earlier. Interaction between the primary CME and the preceding CMEs as they traversed the interplanetary medium also led to amplification of the magnetic field of the ejecta that continued by the time the primary CME reached Earth's orbit. 

The event occurred at a time of high sunspot activity during solar cycle 24.

Predicted effects
Had the CME hit the Earth, it is likely that it would have inflicted serious damage to electronic systems on a global scale. The resulting geomagnetic storm may have had a strength of −1,150 to −600 nT, comparable to the impact of the Carrington Event. A 2013 study estimated that the economic cost to the United States would have been between US$600 billion and $2.6 trillion. Ying D. Liu, professor at China's State Key Laboratory of Space Weather, estimated that the recovery time from such a disaster would have been about four to ten years.

Historical comparisons
The record fastest CME associated with the August 1972 solar storm is thought to have occurred in a similar process of earlier CMEs clearing particles in the path to Earth. This storm arrived in 14.6 hours, an even shorter duration after the parent flare erupted than for the great solar storm of 1859.

See also
 List of solar storms

References

External links
 

Geomagnetic storms
2012 in science
July 2012 events
2012 natural disasters